Lithops divergens is a succulent plant species of the genus Lithops under the family Aizoaceae. It grows around the regions of Southern Africa and it able to withstand intense climatic changes due to its resilience as a succulent. The average rainfall for its natural environment is less than 500mm.

Description 
L. divergens receives its name from its relatively unusual leaf growth. The plant's leaves grow in pairs sometimes clumped together, however the leaves separate in the center and are widely divergent from one another, forming a large fissure between the leaves. This is unlike the majority of its genus, for the leaves tend to grow next to one another without too much separation of most species. The leaves can be colors such as light and dark gray sometimes with tinges of green. The flowers are yellow and can grow to be larger than the leaves themselves. A seed pod will form from the center of the flower if it is pollinated.

References

divergens
Taxa named by Louisa Bolus